Deh-e Shib (also Romanized as Deh-e Shīb and Dehshīb) is a village in Khorramdasht Rural District, in the Central District of Kuhbanan County, Kerman Province, Iran. At the 2006 census, its population was 17, in 4 families.

References 

Populated places in Kuhbanan County